David Peña Dorantes (born 1969) is a Romani pianist and composer from Andalusia (Spain) known for his compositions and performances of flamenco. His music has been influenced by Debussy and jazz. His first album, Orobroy, released in 1998, received both critical and public acclaim. His second album, released in 2001 and titled Sur, was recorded in Paris, Sevilla, and Sofia, and was also well received. His third album, Without Walls!, was released in 2012. Dorantes has collaborated with prominent artists such as Lole Montoya, Alba Molina, Susheela Raman, El Barrio, Arcángel, Carmen Linares, Miguel Poveda, and José Mercé.

References

1969 births
Living people
Spanish pianists
Spanish male composers
Flamenco musicians
People from Lebrija
Romani musicians
Male pianists
21st-century pianists
21st-century male musicians
Spanish Romani people